Harageh (also el-Harageh or Haraga) is a modern village in Egypt at the entrance to the river oasis of the Fayum, close to El-Lahun. In archaeology Harageh is mainly known for a series of cemeteries dating to several periods of Egyptian history. Reginald Engelbach excavated these cemeteries in 1913. The cemeteries belong to the Naqada-Period, to the First Intermediate Period, to the late Middle Kingdom and to the New Kingdom; a few Coptic stelae were discovered here as well. Especially the burials of the late Middle Kingdom belonged to wealthy people. Perhaps the people of El-Lahun were buried here. Engelbach found stelae including the only one known to be dedicated to the god Hedjhotep, inscribed coffins, canopic boxes and jars, and many statues.

Literature 
R. Engelbach: Harageh, London 1923

Archaeological sites in Egypt